Liz Tuccillo is an American writer and producer best known for her work on the HBO comedy series Sex and the City and for co-authoring (with Greg Behrendt) the self-help book He's Just Not That Into You, for which they won a Quill Award. Her first novel, How to Be Single, was published in June 2008 and adapted into a feature film in 2016.

Tuccillo wrote the 2005 television series Related, which aired on the WB network. She directed and wrote the 2008 film Gone to the Dogs and the film Take Care which premiered at South by Southwest in March 2014.

As an actress, she was seen in the film Welcome to New York, in which she had one line.

References

External links

Living people
21st-century American novelists
American women novelists
Year of birth missing (living people)
Place of birth missing (living people)
American women screenwriters
American women television writers
American women non-fiction writers
American television writers
21st-century American screenwriters
21st-century American women writers